Beck – Mannen med ikonerna (English: Beck – The Man with the Icons) is a 1997 film about the Swedish police detective Martin Beck directed by Pelle Seth.

Cast 
 Peter Haber as Martin Beck
 Mikael Persbrandt as Gunvald Larsson
 Figge Norling as Benny Skacke
 Stina Rautelin as Lena Klingström
 Per Morberg as Joakim Wersén
 Åke Lundqvist as Oleg Vassiljev, "Mannen med ikonerna"
 Ingvar Hirdwall as Martin Beck's neighbour
 Rebecka Hemse as Inger (Martin Beck's daughter)
 Fredrik Ultvedt as Jens Loftsgård
 Michael Nyqvist as John Banck
 Anna Ulrica Ericsson as Yvonne Jäder
 Peter Hüttner as Oljelund
 Bo Höglund as Mats (the waiter)
 Jörgen Andersson as a police from the Swedish Security Service (SÄPO)
 Dan Johansson as a police from SÄPO
 Lilian Johansson as Rosa Andrén
 Vladimir Dikanski as Jurij Gulkov
 Paul Fried as Arne Enberg
 Michael Kallaanvaara as Pekka

References

External links 

1990s Swedish-language films
Martin Beck films
1997 television films
1997 films
1997 crime films
1990s police procedural films
Films directed by Pelle Seth
1990s Swedish films